Crudaria wykehami, the Wykeham's grey, is a butterfly of the family Lycaenidae. It is found only in South Africa's Northern Cape.

The wingspan is 20–32 mm for males and 25–34 mm for females. Adults fly year-round particularly from November to February.

The larvae probably feed on Acacia karroo.

References

Butterflies described in 1983
Aphnaeinae